Bozeman-Waters National Bank, also known as the Farmers Bank & Trust Company, is a historic bank building located at Poseyville, Posey County, Indiana.  It was built in 1924, and is a -story, brown brick building with Sullivanesque terra cotta ornamentation. It has a one-story rear section.  The interior was extensively remodeled in 1957.  The building is modeled on the People's Federal Savings and Loan Association in Sidney, Ohio.

It was listed on the National Register of Historic Places in 1987.

References

Bank buildings on the National Register of Historic Places in Indiana
Commercial buildings completed in 1924
Buildings and structures in Posey County, Indiana
National Register of Historic Places in Posey County, Indiana
1924 establishments in Indiana